Crawfordsville may refer to the following places in the United States:

 Crawfordsville, Arkansas
 Crawfordsville, Indiana, largest place with this name
 Crawfordsville, Iowa
 Crawfordsville, Ohio
 Crawfordsville, Oregon

See also
Crawfordville (disambiguation)